A.S.D. Casale Foot Ball Club (formerly A.S. Casale Calcio) is an Italian football club, based in Casale Monferrato, Piedmont.
The club plays in Serie D.

The team's nickname nerostellati (“the starred-blacks”) refers to the team's colours of black with a white star on the chest.

History

When the club was founded in 1909 Casale was at the geographical center of the new footballing movement in Italy.
Genoa, Pro Vercelli, Milan, Torino, and Juventus were all leading clubs in the Italian football league system and Casale soon joined their number.

In May 1913 Casale became the first Italian club to defeat an English professional team when they beat Reading F.C. 2–1. Reading won all the other games on this tour, defeating Genoa, Milan, Pro Vercelli, and even the Italy national team.

In the following season, Casale won their first and only national title. Italian football was then organized on a regional basis and the national championship was divided into three stages. Casale topped the Ligurian-Piedmontese division and proceeded, along with second-placed Genoa, to compete in a division comprising the top northern teams, the others being Inter Milan, Juventus, Vicenza and Verona. Having won that division, Casale defeated central-southern champions Lazio 7–1, 0–2 in the two-leg final.

After World War I, Casale remained in the top division for a couple of decades, representing what had been the cradle of early Italian football.

With the development of professionalism, Casale was progressively relegated to lower divisions, 1934 being their last year in Serie A. The club was later refounded twice, in 1993 and 2013, after financial problems. In 2013, it took the current name of Casale Foot Ball Club.

A heated rivalry exists between the fans of Casale and Alessandria.

Notable players
See also :Category:Casale F.B.C. players
Five players who appeared in the scudetto-winning team of 1913–14 played in the Italy national team, all making their international debuts between 1912 and 1914:
 Luigi Barbesino
 Giovanni Gallina
 Angelo Mattea
 Giuseppe Parodi
 Amedeo Varese

One of Casale's biggest stars, however, was the full back Umberto Caligaris whose career with the club ran from 1919 to 1928. During his period with the nerostellati, he made 37 appearances for Italy national football team, featuring at the 1924 Summer Olympics and winning a bronze medal at the 1928 Summer Olympics before leaving Casale for Juventus. His total of 59 caps stood as a record for about 40 years.

Eraldo Monzeglio, later to represent Italy on numerous occasions, including the 1934 and 1938 World Cups, made his Serie A debut with Casale in 1923–24. The following season, however, he moved to Bologna.

Honours

National titles
Serie A
Winners: 1913–14

Serie B
Winners: 1929–30

Coppa Italia Dilettanti
Winners: 1998–99

Sub-national titles

Serie C
Winners: 1937–38 (Girone C)

Serie C2
Winners: 1988–89 (Girone A)

Serie D
Winners: 1973–74 (Girone A), 1985–86 (Girone A)
Promoted: 2003–04

Notes

References

 
Football clubs in Piedmont and Aosta Valley
Association football clubs established in 1909
Italian football First Division clubs
Serie A clubs
Serie B clubs
Serie C clubs
Serie D clubs
Serie A winning clubs
1909 establishments in Italy